iPhone OS 3 is the third major release of the iOS mobile operating system developed by Apple Inc., succeeding iPhone OS 2. It was announced on March 17, 2009, and was released on June 17, 2009. It was succeeded by iOS 4 on June 21, 2010, dropping the "iPhone OS" naming convention.

iPhone OS 3 added a system-wide "cut, copy, or paste" feature, allowing users to more easily move content. It also introduced Spotlight, a search indexing feature designed to help users locate specific information on their device, such as contacts, email messages or apps. The home screen was expanded to let users add up to 11 pages, showcasing a total of 180 apps. The Messages app received support for MMS, while the Camera app received support for video recording on the iPhone 3GS, and a new "Voice Memos" app let users record their voice. In-app purchase capability was added to third-party applications as well.

Default apps

 iTunes
 App Store
 Text
 Calendar
 Photos
 Camera
 YouTube
 Stocks
 Maps
 Weather 
 Clock
 Calculator
 Notes
 Settings

Default dock
 Phone
 Mail
 Safari
 iPod/Music

System features

Cut, copy, or paste 
iPhone OS 3 introduced a "cut, copy, or paste" bubble dialog when users press and hold text. The "paste" button would incorporate anything stored in the device's clipboard into the marked area.

Spotlight 
Spotlight is a system-wide indexing and search feature, aiming to help users search their device for specific contacts, email messages, calendar appointments, multimedia files, apps and more. It is accessed by swiping to the right from the home screen.

Home screen 
iPhone OS 3 expands the maximum number of pages on the home screen to 11, for a total number of 180 apps.

Find My iPhone 
Users with subscriptions to MobileMe were able to remotely track, lock, and erase their iPhones if lost.

App features

Messages 
The Messages app received native support for the Multimedia Messaging Service (MMS), allowing users to send and receive messages that also contain pictures, contacts, locations, voice recordings, and video messages.

Camera and Photos 
The Camera app introduced video recording for the iPhone 3GS.

The Photos app featured a new copy button and the ability to delete multiple photos at once.

Cost
Upgrading to iPhone OS 3 was free for iPhone. Upgrading to iPhone OS 3 originally cost iPod Touch users $9.95; updating to 3.1.x from 2.x cost only $4.95.

iPhone OS 3 was the last major version of iOS for which there was a charge for iPod Touch users to upgrade. Starting with iOS 4, iOS upgrades became free for all users, including users of iPod touch, as the Sarbanes-Oxley Act was revised to allow software upgrades for free with non-subscription-based hardware.

Supported devices

iPhone
iPhone (1st generation)
iPhone 3G
iPhone 3GS

iPod Touch
iPod Touch (1st generation)
iPod Touch (2nd generation)
iPod Touch (3rd generation)

iPad
iPad (1st generation)

Version history

References

External links 
 

3
2009 software
Products introduced in 2009
Mobile operating systems
Proprietary operating systems